Qatar-5b is a Hot Jupiter orbiting the star Qatar-5 located in Andromeda constellation. It orbits its star every 2.87 days. It was discovered in 2016 by the Qatar Exoplanet Survey (QES).

References

Exoplanets discovered in 2016
Hot Jupiters

Andromeda (constellation)